This is a list of ballads found in Sveriges Medeltida Ballader.

Ballads of the supernatural (Naturmytiska visor)

Legendary ballads (Legendvisor)

Historical ballads (Historiska visor)

Ballads of chivalry (Riddarvisor)

Heroic ballads (Kämpavisor)

Jocular ballads (Skämtvisor)

See also 
Danmarks gamle Folkeviser

Sources

Notes 

Sveriges Medeltida Ballader
Swedish folk songs
Ballad collections